Antoine Monnoyer (1670 – 1747), was a French painter.

Biography	
He was born in Paris as the son and pupil of Jean-Baptiste Monnoyer. He is known for flower still lifes in the manner of his father and he was the teacher of Andien de Clermont. He is sometimes referred to as Baptiste (le jeune).
He died in Saint-Germain-en-Laye.

References	
	
 	
Antoine Monnoyer on Artnet	
	
	
	
	
	
1670 births	
1747 deaths	
French painters	
Artists from Paris